Willy Hameister (3 December 1889 – 13 February 1938) was a German cinematographer.

Selected filmography
 The Plague of Florence (1919)
 The Dance of Death (1919)
 Genuine (1920)
 Christian Wahnschaffe (1920)
 The Night of Queen Isabeau (1920)
 The Cabinet of Dr. Caligari (1920)
 The Island of the Lost (1921)
 Peter the Great (1922)
 Your Valet (1922)
 The Doll Maker of Kiang-Ning (1923)
 Man by the Wayside (1923)
 The Blonde Geisha (1923)
 The Shadow of the Mosque (1923)
 Passion (1925)
 The Girl on the Road (1925)
 Love and Trumpets (1925)
 Princess Trulala (1926)
 Kissing Is No Sin (1926)
 Rinaldo Rinaldini (1927)
 A Serious Case (1927)
 Light Cavalry (1927)
 Carnival Magic (1927)
 The Carousel of Death  (1928)
 Tales from the Vienna Woods (1928)
 Charlotte Somewhat Crazy (1928)
 Mikosch Comes In (1928)
 We Stick Together Through Thick and Thin (1929)
 Revolt in the Batchelor's House (1929)
 Police Spy 77 (1930)
 The Woman Without Nerves (1930)
 Susanne Cleans Up (1930)
 Madame Pompadour (1931)
 A Caprice of Pompadour (1931)
 Ash Wednesday (1931)
 Terror of the Garrison (1931)
 Duty Is Duty (1931)
 Without Meyer, No Celebration is Complete (1931)
 Wibbel the Tailor (1931)
 Death Over Shanghai (1932)
 Two Heavenly Blue Eyes (1932)
 At Your Orders, Sergeant (1932)
 Gretel Wins First Prize (1933)
 The Sandwich Girl (1933)
 Heimat am Rhein (1933)
 Girls in White (1936)

Bibliography
 Jung, Uli & Schatzberg, Walter. Beyond Caligari: The Films of Robert Wiene. Berghahn Books, 1999.

External links

1889 births
1938 deaths
German cinematographers
Film people from Berlin